Dannebrog was a Danish royal side-wheel paddle steam yacht, which was built in 1879 and decommissioned in 1931. Dannebrog was named in honor of the flag of Denmark.

History
Paddle-wheel steamer "Dannebrog", a type of yacht, launched on 6 October 1879. The yacht was commissioned in the Danish Fleet on 7 June 1880. During the summer months of 1880-1892, the Dannebrog underwent expeditions in Danish waters and visited several foreign ports. There was also a voyage in 1893 to England, due to the marriage of the Duke of York and Princess Mary of Teck. The cruiser "Valkyrien" escorted the yacht during this voyage. There was a voyage to Aarhus in 1902 due to the Crown Prince Christian and Princess Alexandrina receiving the Marselisborg Castle as a present. The construction of Marselesborg castle in Aarhus was completed in 1902 and the castle was a gift from Danish people to them. 

Dannebrog brought the Danish prince Carl and his family from Denmark to Norway to assume the Norwegian throne, departing Denmark on 23 November 1905. His coronation as king Haakon VII was carried out in Trondheim in June 1906. From December 1906 - 1907, the yacht had an overhaul, where its length was increased to 72 meters and a newly designed main engine with bigger dimensions was installed. Simultaneously, tonnage was increased to 1,100 tonnes. Two funnels were installed on the yacht.

During the summer months of 1909, the yacht had an expedition in Danish waters, and from 11-23 July, a voyage to Russia, escorted by the cruiser Gejser, was held. From 14-17 May 1912, the yacht was escorted by coastal defense ship called "Olfert Fischer" during the voyage to Travemünde to move the coffin of the King Frederick VIII, who died in Hamburg on 14 May 1912. Then, the yacht had a voyage back to Copenhagen.

During the summer months of 1913, the yacht travelled Danish waters and visited Landskrona (Sweden) and Rostock (Germany). In 1914, the Dannebrog made trips to Sheerness, Dover, Calais, and Amsterdam, and then expeditions in the Danish waters. The yacht idled during World War I from 1914-1918, and underwent another expedition in Danish waters during the summer months of 1919. There was a voyage to South Jutland on 10 July 1920, for the occasion of the reunification. 19 August, 1929 she was in a collision with Japanese cargo ship  at Copenhagen, Denmark. The yacht was scrapped in 1934.

References

1879 ships
Ships built in Copenhagen
Auxiliary ships of the Royal Danish Navy
Royal and presidential yachts
Steamships of Denmark
Individual yachts
Steam yachts
Paddle steamers
Danish monarchy